Grehan is a surname. Notable people with the surname include:

Ceara Grehan, Northern Irish theatrical and opera singer
Derry Grehan (born 1957), Canadian guitarist
Francie Grehan, Gaelic footballer
James Grehan (disambiguation), multiple people
Martin Grehan (born 1984), Scottish footballer
Stephen Grehan (born 1971), Irish retired hurler